{|
{{Infobox ship image
|Ship image= [[File:Revenue Cutter Jefferson Davis model.jpg|250px|border|alt=Model of Pickenss sister ship Jefferson Davis]]
}}

|}CSS Pickens (originally known as USRC Robert McClelland''') was a  revenue cutter that saw service in the navies of the United States and Confederate States of America. In 1860, Robert McClelland reported to South West Pass, Mississippi, and was permanently assigned to New Orleans, Louisiana, later that year. After the 1861 secession of Louisiana, her commander turned her over to the state. She entered Confederate service on February 18 and was renamed Pickens. Pickens played a minor role in the Battle of the Head of Passes before being burned to prevent its capture on April 25, 1862, after Union Navy forces entered New Orleans.

Service history
United States service
Originally a United States revenue cutter, Robert McClelland was a topsail schooner built by J. M. Hood in Somerset, Massachusetts, with Captain N. L. Coste supervising the construction; the fitting-out process was to occur in New York. Reports placed her armament at between one and five guns. She did not have engines and was powered by sail. The vessel was christened on April 18, 1853, launched on July 11, and was commissioned at some point during 1853. All of the Cushing-class vessels were named after figures in the Franklin Pierce administration, with Robert McClelland being named after the Secretary of the Interior, Robert McClelland.

She left for Mobile, Alabama, on November 23, and reached there on December 7.  As of January 14, 1854, Robert McClelland was reported to have been sent to Bermuda to transport dispatches about the wreck of the steamer San Francisco to vessels located there.  San Francisco had sunk with heavy loss of life while transporting passengers, including members of the 3rd Artillery Regiment, from New York City to San Francisco.  She then patrolled the coastlines of Texas and Louisiana.  On May 29, 1859, an order arrived for the ship to send her crew and officers to the cutter  and then go to New York to be repaired; she arrived on July 11.  On September 1, 1860, she returned to South West Pass, Mississippi with orders to exchange officers and crew with Washington; Robert McClelland was permanently assigned to New Orleans, Louisiana, on November 8, 1860.

Confederate service
The state of Louisiana seceded from the Union on January 26, 1861, and Captain J. G. Breshwood, Robert McClellands commanding officer, refused to take the ship north.  United States Secretary of the Treasury John Adams Dix ordered Second Lieutenant Samuel B. Caldwell to take command of the ship and treat Breshwood as a mutineer if necessary. This order was not received, and Breshwood surrendered the ship to Louisiana authorities on January 31. She entered Confederate service on February 18. Breshwood and the ship's two lieutenants, Caldwell and Thomas Fister, entered the Confederate States Revenue Service and were reassigned to Robert McClelland, which was renamed Pickens.  She was armed with three cannons during her Confederate service: a  Columbiad and two carronades.

On September 20, the sidewheel steamer  entered the Mississippi River.  Pickens and the armed towboat  were stationed at Head of Passes and withdrew to Fort Jackson.  Water Witch fired 23 rounds at the two ships while they retreated before bombarding riverbank positions once left alone; she withdrew back to the Gulf of Mexico that evening, passively followed by Ivy.  Union vessels entered the Mississippi in late September and early October.  After occupying the Head of Passes, the Union naval force identified a location for a shore fortification and began preparing the site.  When Commodore George N. Hollins collected all available naval forces for an attack on Union vessels at Head of Passes, Pickens was one of the ships that gathered at Fort Jackson on October 11.  Hollins's fleet, led by the ironclad , advanced downriver on the morning of October 12.  Pickens was at the rear of the fleet, as her lack of engines would make it difficult to maneuver in battle conditions.  Along with the gunboat  (which had been converted from a tugboat), Pickens guided fire rafts towards the Union positions during the battle.  In the ensuing Battle of the Head of Passes, the Union ships abandoned the area in haste, with two temporarily running aground during the retreat.  The Confederates destroyed a supply of wood earmarked for the planned fortification, captured the supply ship Joseph H. Toone, and lightly damaged the sloop-of-war USS Richmond. Manassas suffered significant damage during the fighting.

The fighting did not change the overall strategic situation, as the Union ships simply blockaded the outlets between Head of Passes and the Gulf of Mexico. When Hollins and most of his ships moved upriver to Kentucky beginning in November, Pickens and Washington, which had also been surrendered in 1861, remained behind at New Orleans.  While the two ships primarily took taxes from blockade runners, they were left behind as a potential defense force for the city.  During the rest of 1861 and early 1862, Pickens served on the lower part of the Mississippi River.  On April 24, 14 Union Navy ships under the command of Flag Officer David Glasgow Farragut forced their way past Forts Jackson and Fort St. Philip, arriving at New Orleans on April 25. The same day, Pickens'' was burned to prevent her capture.  During the burning, a sailor boarded the ship and removed her Confederate and old United States flags.

References

Sources
 
 
 
 

 
 
 

Ships of the United States Revenue Cutter Service
Ships of the Confederate States Navy
Maritime incidents in April 1862
Scuttled vessels
1853 ships
Captured ships
Ship fires
Ships built in Somerset, Massachusetts